The 1985–86 Hartford Whalers season saw the Whalers finish in fourth place in the Adams Division with a record of 40 wins, 36 losses, and 4 ties for 84 points. They beat the Quebec Nordiques in the Adams Division Semifinals in three games, for their first and only playoff series victory in franchise history. They lost the Adams Division Finals in seven games to the Montreal Canadiens. Because the Whalers made it to the Adams Division Finals, the 1985–86 season is considered by many to be the most successful in Whalers history.

Offseason
At the 1985 NHL Entry Draft held at Maple Leaf Gardens in Toronto, Ontario, the Hartford Whalers selected defenseman Dana Murzyn from the Calgary Wranglers of the WHL with their first round, fifth overall draft pick. In 72 games with the Wranglers, Murzyn scored 32 goals, 92 points and accumulated 233 penalty minutes during the 1984–85 season. In eight playoff games, Murzyn had a goal and 12 points. Some other notable picks by the Whalers included goaltender Kay Whitmore from the Peterborough Petes in the second round, and right winger Shane Churla from the Medicine Hat Tigers in the sixth round.

On September 19, the Whalers signed free agent center John Newberry. In 16 games with the Montreal Canadiens during the 1984–85 season, Newberry had four assists. With the Sherbrooke Canadiens of the AHL, Newberry scored 23 goals and 63 points in 58 games.

Hartford acquired defenseman Tim Bothwell in a trade with the St. Louis Blues on October 4, as the Whalers sent cash to the Blues to complete the trade. Bothwell scored four goals and 26 points in 79 with the Blues during the 1984–85 season. He also had a +27 rating, and over the past two seasons, Bothwell was a +49.

Three days later, on October 7, Hartford traded defenseman Chris Kotsopoulos to the Toronto Maple Leafs in exchange for left winger Stew Gavin. Gavin scored 12 goals and 25 points in 73 games with Toronto in 1984–85. In 268 career games to date, Gavin scored 34 goals and 82 points since beginning his career in the 1980–81 season.

NHL Draft

Regular season

October
Hartford began the 1985–86 season on the road against the Buffalo Sabres on October 10. The Whalers, led by two goals by Kevin Dineen, overcame a 3–0 deficit to defeat the Sabres 5–4. Two nights later, on October 12, the Whalers hosted the New York Rangers for their home opener, and were led by two goals by Ron Francis and Ray Ferraro, as well as 33 saves by Mike Liut, as Hartford defeated New York 8–2 in front of 15,142 fans at the Civic Center.

The Whalers dropped their next game to the Quebec Nordiques, however, they would win their following two games, including a wild 11–6 victory over the Montreal Canadiens, to open the season 4–1–0. Hartford then began a four-game road trip, in which they dropped their first three games before salvaging a victory over the Pittsburgh Penguins, bringing their record to 5–4–0.

In their final game of the month, Hartford defeated the Quebec Nordiques on home ice, finishing October with a 6–4–0 record, as they earned 12 points. The Whalers sat in third place in the Adams Division, five points behind the first place Quebec Nordiques.

November
Hartford got off to a tough start in November, losing their first three games, including blowout losses of 8–1 to the Los Angeles Kings and 8–3 to the Montreal Canadiens. The Whalers ended their losing streak with a 4–3 win over the Quebec Nordiques as they stormed back from a 3–0 third period deficit to take the victory.

The Whalers won their next game against the Minnesota North Stars, however, this followed by another three game losing skid, dropping the Whalers to a record of 8–10–0 and falling into last place in the Adams Division. On November 21, the Whalers acquired defenseman Dave Babych from the Winnipeg Jets in exchange for right winger Ray Neufeld. Babych had four goals and 16 points in 19 games with the Jets at the time of the trade. A high-scoring defenseman, Babych had recorded at least 60 points in three of his four previous seasons, including 74 points in 79 games with Winnipeg in 1982–83.

The trade sparked the Whalers to a huge 8–1 win over the Winnipeg Jets on November 23, as Ron Francis led the way with a hat trick. In their next game, the Whalers shutout the Los Angeles Kings 9–0, as Mike Liut earned the shutout with 30 saves.

The Whalers won their third game in row on November 29, defeating the Vancouver Canucks 5–4, however, the Edmonton Oilers snapped the Whalers winning streak the next night, as they defeated Hartford 8–5.

Hartford struggled to a 5–7–0 record in November, dropping their overall record to 11–11–0 through their first 22 games. The Whalers were in last place in the Adams Division, three points behind the Montreal Canadiens for the final playoff spot.

December
The Whalers opened December the same way they closed November, as Hartford lost by a score of 8–5, this time to the Calgary Flames, on December 4. Two days later, Hartford acquired center Doug Jarvis from the Washington Capitals for left winger Jörgen Pettersson. Jarvis, who began his NHL career with the Montreal Canadiens in the 1975–76 season, had never missed a game in his career, as he had played in 825 games in a row at the time of the trade. Jarvis was a four time Stanley Cup champion with the Canadiens, winning the Cup in 1976, 1977, 1978, and 1979. He was traded to the Washington Capitals prior to the 1982–83 season, and won the Selke Trophy in 1984. Jarvis had a goal and three points in 25 games with Washington to begin the 1985–86 season.

In their next six games after the trade, the Whalers posted a record of 4–1–1 to climb over the .500 mark with an overall record of 15–13–1, pulling the Whalers within one point of the Buffalo Sabres for the fourth and final playoff position in the Adams Division.

Hartford dropped two of their final three games before Christmas, however, the Whalers rebounded by winning their first three games after the Christmas break, before dropping their final game of December.

The Whalers posted a record of 8–5–1 record during December, bringing their overall record to 19–16–1 through 36 games. The Whalers were tied with the Buffalo Sabres for the fourth and final playoff spot in the Adams Division. They were also only three points behind the first place Montreal Canadiens, as three points separated first and last place in the division.

January
Hartford dropped their first two games on January, losing to the Quebec Nordiques and Edmonton Oilers, bringing their overall losing streak to three games. The Whalers ended their losing skid with a 9–1 win over the Calgary Flames, as Dean Evason and Kevin Dineen each scored hat tricks in the victory. Hartford won their next game against the Vancouver Canucks, before dropping two in a row.

On January 17, the Whalers acquired Wayne Babych, the older brother of Whalers defenseman Dave Babych, from the Quebec Nordiques, in exchange for Greg Malone. Babych, who was acquired by Quebec from the Pittsburgh Penguins earlier in the season, had six goals and 11 points in 15 games with the Nordiques. His best season came in 1980–81, while as a member of the St. Louis Blues, Babych scored 54 goals and 96 points in 78 games. During that season, he led the NHL with 40 even strength goals.

The trade marked the beginning of a five-game winning streak, as that evening, the Whalers defeated the Quebec Nordiques 11–6. On January 21, the Whalers shutout the New York Rangers 5–0, as Steve Weeks stopped all 19 shots he faced.

The Whalers winning streak came to an end on January 27, as the Boston Bruins defeated Hartford 6–3. Two nights later, in the Whalers final game of the month, the club lost to the Boston Bruins 5–4 in overtime.

Hartford earned a record of 7–6–0 during January, which was their second consecutive winning month of the season. Their overall record at the end of January was 26–22–1, as the club had 53 points and sat in the fourth and final playoff spot in the Adams Division, two points ahead of the fifth place Buffalo Sabres.

February
The Whalers continued their winless skid into February, as Hartford began February with a 0–7–1 record in their first eight games, bringing their overall winless skid to 10 games (0–9–1). During this slump, the club acquired center Bill Gardner from the Chicago Black Hawks in exchange for a third round draft pick in the 1987 NHL Entry Draft. Gardner scored three goals and 13 points in 46 games with Chicago during the 1985–86 season.

The winless skid dropped the Whalers overall record to 26–29–2 following their 4–1 loss to the Minnesota North Stars on February 15. This dropped the club into last place in the Adams Division, six points behind the fourth place Buffalo Sabres.

On February 18, the Whalers earned their first win of February, a 5–4 victory over the Vancouver Canucks. The next night, the Whalers defeated the Buffalo Sabres 6–4, bringing their winning streak to two games. This came to an abrupt end, as Hartford lost their remaining three games of February.

The Whalers posted a record of 2–10–1 during February, dropping their overall record to 28–32–2. The club had earned 59 points and sat in last place, six points behind the Buffalo Sabres for the final playoff position in the Adams Division.

March/April
Hartford opened March with another loss, as the Pittsburgh Penguins defeated Hartford 8–2 on March 1, extending their losing streak to four games. Hartford broke out of their slump, by winning their next three games, including two over the Buffalo Sabres, to improve their record to 31–33–2, cutting the Sabres lead to four points.

On March 8, the Whalers acquired right winger John Anderson from the Quebec Nordiques for defenseman Risto Siltanen. Anderson had 21 goals and 49 points in 65 games with the Nordiques in 1985–86, his first season with the club. He previously appeared in 534 games with the Toronto Maple Leafs from 1977 to 1985, scoring 189 goals and 393 points with the Maple Leafs. That evening, the Whalers, despite an assist from Anderson, lost to the Nordiques 6–3, ending their winning streak at three games.

Following a 5–2 win over the Montreal Canadiens on March 10, the Whalers acquired defenseman Mike McEwen from the New York Rangers for right winger Bob Crawford. McEwen was acquired by New York from the Detroit Red Wings earlier in the season, and between the two clubs, he two goals and 17 points in 45 games. McEwen was a member of the New York Islanders from 1980 to 1984, winning three Stanley Cup championships in 1981, 1982, and 1983.

On March 13, the New York Islanders defeated Hartford 5–2, dropping the Whalers record to 32–35–2, as Hartford was now six points behind the Buffalo Sabres for the final playoff position. On March 15, the Whalers crushed the Chicago Black Hawks 11–4, which began an eight-game unbeaten streak in which the Whalers earned a record of 6–0–2. On April 1, the Whalers met the Buffalo Sabres, with both teams tied for fourth place in the Adams Division. After Ray Ferraro gave the Whalers a 1–0 lead, the Sabres scored three in a row, taking a 3–1 lead in the second period. Hartford, clinging onto their playoff hopes, scored four goals in a row, including two goals by Kevin Dineen, to defeat the Sabres 5–3 and take over fourth place.

The Whalers ended the season with two wins in their final three games to clinch the fourth and final playoff position in the Adams Division. The club earned a record of 12–4–2 in their final 18 games, bringing their overall record to 40–36–4. The 40 victories and 84 points were franchise records, breaking the previous record of 30 wins set in 1984–85, and 73 points set in their inaugural season in 1979–80. This ended the Whalers five year playoff drought, as the club clinched their first playoff berth since 1980.

Season standings

Schedule and results

Regular season

|- style="background:#cfc;"
| 1 || October 10, 1985 || @ Buffalo Sabres || 5–4 || || Liut || Buffalo Memorial Auditorium || 12,278 || 1–0–0 || 2 || W1
|- style="background:#cfc;"
| 2 || October 12, 1985 || New York Rangers || 8–2 || || Liut || Hartford Civic Center || 15,142 || 2–0–0 || 4 || W2
|- style="background:#fcc;"
| 3 || October 15, 1985 || @ Quebec Nordiques || 1–4 || || Liut || Quebec Coliseum || 12,666 || 2–1–0 || 4 || L1
|- style="background:#cfc;"
| 4 || October 17, 1985 || @ New Jersey Devils || 4–3 || OT || Weeks || Brendan Byrne Arena || 7,962 || 3–1–0 || 6 || W1
|- style="background:#cfc;"
| 5 || October 19, 1985 || Montreal Canadiens || 11–6 || || Liut || Hartford Civic Center || 13,048 || 4–1–0 || 8 || W2
|- style="background:#fcc;"
| 6 || October 23, 1985 || @ Chicago Black Hawks || 2–9 || || Liut || Chicago Stadium || 14,971 || 4–2–0 || 8 || L1
|- style="background:#fcc;"
| 7 || October 24, 1985 || @ Philadelphia Flyers || 0–3 || || Weeks || The Spectrum || 17,053 || 4–3–0 || 8 || L2
|- style="background:#fcc;"
| 8 || October 26, 1985 || @ Montreal Canadiens || 3–5 || || Liut || Montreal Forum || 16,735 || 4–4–0 || 8 || L3
|- style="background:#cfc;"
| 9 || October 29, 1985 || @ Pittsburgh Penguins || 4–3 || || Liut || Pittsburgh Civic Arena || 6,793 || 5–4–0 || 10 || W1
|- style="background:#cfc;"
| 10 || October 30, 1985 || Quebec Nordiques || 6–4 || || Weeks || Hartford Civic Center || 11,014 || 6–4–0 || 12 || W2
|-

|- style="background:#fcc;"
| 11 || November 2, 1985 || Los Angeles Kings || 1–8 || || Weeks || Hartford Civic Center || 12,024 || 6–5–0 || 12 || L1
|- style="background:#fcc;"
| 12 || November 5, 1985 || Montreal Canadiens || 3–8 || || Liut || Hartford Civic Center || 10,820 || 6–6–0 || 12 || L2
|- style="background:#fcc;"
| 13 || November 7, 1985 || @ Boston Bruins || 1–2 || || Weeks || Boston Garden || 12,787 || 6–7–0 || 12 || L3
|- style="background:#cfc;"
| 14 || November 9, 1985 || @ Quebec Nordiques || 4–3 || || Liut || Quebec Coliseum || 14,552 || 7–7–0 || 14 || W1
|- style="background:#cfc;"
| 15 || November 13, 1985 || Minnesota North Stars || 5–2 || || Liut || Hartford Civic Center || 9,732 || 8–7–0 || 16 || W2
|- style="background:#fcc;"
| 16 || November 16, 1985 || Philadelphia Flyers || 2–5 || || Weeks || Hartford Civic Center || 15,142 || 8–8–0 || 16 || L1
|- style="background:#fcc;"
| 17 || November 19, 1985 || Buffalo Sabres || 0–2 || || Liut || Hartford Civic Center || 10,027 || 8–9–0 || 16 || L2
|- style="background:#fcc;"
| 18 || November 21, 1985 || @ Philadelphia Flyers || 0–3 || || Liut || The Spectrum || 17,211 || 8–10–0 || 16 || L3
|- style="background:#cfc;"
| 19 || November 23, 1985 || Winnipeg Jets || 8–1 || || Liut || Hartford Civic Center || 11,957 || 9–10–0 || 18 || W1
|- style="background:#cfc;"
| 20 || November 27, 1985 || @ Los Angeles Kings || 9–0 || || Liut || The Forum || 8,888 || 10–10–0 || 20 || W2
|- style="background:#cfc;"
| 21 || November 29, 1985 || @ Vancouver Canucks || 5–4 || || Liut || Pacific Coliseum || 9,276 || 11–10–0 || 22 || W3
|- style="background:#fcc;"
| 22 || November 30, 1985 || @ Edmonton Oilers || 5–8 || || Weeks || Northlands Coliseum || 17,304 || 11–11–0 || 22 || L1
|-

|- style="background:#fcc;"
| 23 || December 4, 1985 || @ Calgary Flames || 5–8 || || Liut || Olympic Saddledome || 16,672 || 11–12–0 || 22 || L2
|- style="background:#cfc;"
| 24 || December 7, 1985 || Boston Bruins || 7–2 || || Liut || Hartford Civic Center || 15,126 || 12–12–0 || 24 || W1
|- style="background:#fcc;"
| 25 || December 11, 1985 || Montreal Canadiens || 1–3 || || Liut || Hartford Civic Center || 11,262 || 12–13–0 || 24 || L1
|- style="background:#cfc;"
| 26 || December 13, 1985 || @ Buffalo Sabres || 6–4 || || Liut || Buffalo Memorial Auditorium || 11,519 || 13–13–0 || 26 || W1
|- style="background:#cfc;"
| 27 || December 14, 1985 || Pittsburgh Penguins || 5–4 || || Liut || Hartford Civic Center || 10,938 || 14–13–0 || 28 || W2
|- style="background:#ffc;"
| 28 || December 16, 1985 || @ Montreal Canadiens || 4–4 || OT || Liut || Montreal Forum || 16,296 || 14–13–1 || 29 || T1
|- style="background:#cfc;"
| 29 || December 18, 1985 || Calgary Flames || 4–3 || || Weeks || Hartford Civic Center || 9,929 || 15–13–1 || 31 || W1
|- style="background:#fcc;"
| 30 || December 19, 1985 || @ Boston Bruins || 1–2 || || Liut || Boston Garden || 10,244 || 15–14–1 || 31 || L1
|- style="background:#cfc;"
| 31 || December 21, 1985 || New Jersey Devils || 7–6 || || Liut || Hartford Civic Center || 11,229 || 16–14–1 || 33 || W1
|- style="background:#fcc;"
| 32 || December 23, 1985 || New York Islanders || 3–6 || || Liut || Hartford Civic Center || 14,263 || 16–15–1 || 33 || L1
|- style="background:#cfc;"
| 33 || December 26, 1985 || @ New York Islanders || 4–3 || || Weeks || Nassau Coliseum || 16,152 || 17–15–1 || 35 || W1
|- style="background:#cfc;"
| 34 || December 28, 1985 || @ Toronto Maple Leafs || 6–3 || || Weeks || Maple Leaf Gardens || 16,285 || 18–15–1 || 37 || W2
|- style="background:#cfc;"
| 35 || December 29, 1985 || Detroit Red Wings || 5–2 || || Liut || Hartford Civic Center || 12,762 || 19–15–1 || 39 || W3
|- style="background:#fcc;"
| 36 || December 31, 1985 || @ Quebec Nordiques || 1–5 || || Weeks || Quebec Coliseum || 13,644 || 19–16–1 || 39 || L1
|-

|- style="background:#fcc;"
| 37 || January 2, 1986 || Quebec Nordiques || 2–3 || || Liut || Hartford Civic Center || 11,664 || 19–17–1 || 39 || L2
|- style="background:#fcc;"
| 38 || January 4, 1986 || @ Edmonton Oilers || 3–4 || || Liut || Northlands Coliseum || 17,282 || 19–18–1 || 39 || L3
|- style="background:#cfc;"
| 39 || January 7, 1986 || @ Calgary Flames || 9–1 || || Weeks || Olympic Saddledome || 16,762 || 20–18–1 || 41 || W1
|- style="background:#cfc;"
| 40 || January 10, 1986 || @ Vancouver Canucks || 4–3 || || Liut || Pacific Coliseum || 9,539 || 21–18–1 || 43 || W2
|- style="background:#fcc;"
| 41 || January 12, 1986 || @ Chicago Black Hawks || 2–4 || || Weeks || Chicago Stadium || 17,301 || 21–19–1 || 43 || L1
|- style="background:#fcc;"
| 42 || January 15, 1986 || Edmonton Oilers || 1–4 || || Liut || Hartford Civic Center || 15,126 || 21–20–1 || 43 || L2
|- style="background:#cfc;"
| 43 || January 17, 1986 || Quebec Nordiques || 11–6 || || Weeks || Hartford Civic Center || 12,486 || 22–20–1 || 45 || W1
|- style="background:#cfc;"
| 44 || January 18, 1986 || @ Quebec Nordiques || 11–6 || || Liut || Quebec Coliseum || 15,012 || 23–20–1 || 47 || W2
|- style="background:#cfc;"
| 45 || January 20, 1986 || @ New York Rangers || 5–0 || || Weeks || Madison Square Garden || 17,419 || 24–20–1 || 49 || W3
|- style="background:#cfc;"
| 46 || January 23, 1986 || Toronto Maple Leafs || 4–1 || || Liut || Hartford Civic Center || 12,035 || 25–20–1 || 51 || W4
|- style="background:#cfc;"
| 47 || January 25, 1986 || Winnipeg Jets || 7–2 || || || Hartford Civic Center || 12,471 || 26–20–1 || 53 || W5
|- style="background:#fcc;"
| 48 || January 27, 1986 || @ Boston Bruins || 3–6 || || Liut || Boston Garden || 10,496 || 26–21–1 || 53 || L1
|- style="background:#fcc;"
| 49 || January 29, 1986 || Boston Bruins || 4–5 || OT || Weeks || Hartford Civic Center || 14,756 || 26–22–1 || 53 || L2
|-

|- style="background:#fcc;"
| 50 || February 1, 1986 || New York Rangers || 1–3 || || Liut || Hartford Civic Center || 15,126 || 26–23–1 || 53 || L3
|- style="background:#fcc;"
| 51 || February 2, 1986 || Washington Capitals || 4–5 || || Liut || Hartford Civic Center || 12,473 || 26–24–1 || 53 || L4
|- style="text-align:center; background:#bbcaff;"
| colspan="11" | 38th All-Star Game in Hartford, Connecticut
|- style="background:#fcc;"
| 52 || February 6, 1986 || @ Detroit Red Wings || 3–4 || OT || Liut || Joe Louis Arena || 16,758 || 26–25–1 || 53 || L5
|- style="background:#fcc;"
| 53 || February 8, 1986 || Buffalo Sabres || 2–4 || || Liut || Hartford Civic Center || 14,088 || 26–26–1 || 53 || L6
|- style="background:#fcc;"
| 54 || February 9, 1986 || New Jersey Devils || 3–6 || || Weeks || Hartford Civic Center || 10,609 || 26–27–1 || 53 || L7
|- style="background:#ffc;"
| 55 || February 11, 1986 || @ St. Louis Blues || 4–4 || OT || Liut || St. Louis Arena || 10,877 || 26–27–2 || 54 || T1
|- style="background:#fcc;"
| 56 || February 14, 1986 || @ Winnipeg Jets || 4–5 || || Weeks || Winnipeg Arena || 14,620 || 26–28–2 || 54 || L1
|- style="background:#fcc;"
| 57 || February 15, 1986 || @ Minnesota North Stars || 1–4 || || Weeks || Met Center || 12,726 || 26–29–2 || 54 || L2
|- style="background:#cfc;"
| 58 || February 18, 1986 || Vancouver Canucks || 5–4 || || Weeks || Hartford Civic Center || 10,812 || 27–29–2 || 56 || W1
|- style="background:#cfc;"
| 59 || February 19, 1986 || @ Buffalo Sabres || 6–4 || || Liut || Buffalo Memorial Auditorium || 15,624 || 28–29–2 || 58 || W2
|- style="background:#fcc;"
| 60 || February 22, 1986 || @ Montreal Canadiens || 3–6 || || Liut || Montreal Forum || 17,671 || 28–30–2 || 58 || L1
|- style="background:#fcc;"
| 61 || February 23, 1986 || St. Louis Blues || 2–8 || || Liut || Hartford Civic Center || 12,117 || 28–31–2 || 58 || L2
|- style="background:#fcc;"
| 62 || February 26, 1986 || Minnesota North Stars || 2–5 || || Liut || Hartford Civic Center || 11,042 || 28–32–2 || 58 || L3
|-

|- style="background:#fcc;"
| 63 || March 1, 1986 || @ Pittsburgh Penguins || 1–5 || || Weeks || Pittsburgh Civic Arena || 16,033 || 28–33–2 || 58 || L4
|- style="background:#cfc;"
| 64 || March 2, 1986 || Boston Bruins || 4–1 || || Liut || Hartford Civic Center || 13,806 || 29–33–2 || 60 || W1
|- style="background:#cfc;"
| 65 || March 5, 1986 || Buffalo Sabres || 5–1 || || Liut || Hartford Civic Center || 13,019 || 30–33–2 || 62 || W2
|- style="background:#cfc;"
| 66 || March 7, 1986 || @ Buffalo Sabres || 6–2 || || Liut || Buffalo Memorial Auditorium || 15,764 || 31–33–2 || 64 || W3
|- style="background:#fcc;"
| 67 || March 8, 1986 || Quebec Nordiques || 3–6 || || Liut || Hartford Civic Center || 13,616 || 31–34–2 || 64 || L1
|- style="background:#cfc;"
| 68 || March 10, 1986 || @ Montreal Canadiens || 5–2 || || Liut || Montreal Forum || 16,616 || 32–34–2 || 66 || W1
|- style="background:#fcc;"
| 69 || March 13, 1986 || New York Islanders || 2–3 || || Liut || Hartford Civic Center || 13,140 || 32–35–2 || 66 || L1
|- style="background:#cfc;"
| 70 || March 15, 1986 || Chicago Black Hawks || 11–4 || || Liut || Hartford Civic Center || 12,233 || 33–35–2 || 68 || W1
|- style="background:#cfc;"
| 71 || March 18, 1986 || @ Detroit Red Wings || 6–4 || || Liut || Joe Louis Arena || 15,640 || 34–35–2 || 70 || W2
|- style="background:#cfc;"
| 72 || March 19, 1986 || @ St. Louis Blues || 5–2 || || Liut || St. Louis Arena || 8,377 || 35–35–2 || 72 || W3
|- style="background:#cfc;"
| 73 || March 22, 1986 || Los Angeles Kings || 6–3 || || Liut || Hartford Civic Center || 12,198 || 36–35–2 || 74 || W4
|- style="background:#ffc;"
| 74 || March 23, 1986 || Boston Bruins || 5–5 || OT || Liut || Hartford Civic Center || 15,126 || 36–35–3 || 75 || T1
|- style="background:#cfc;"
| 75 || March 26, 1986 || Montreal Canadiens || 3–0 || || Liut || Hartford Civic Center || 13,877 || 37–35–3 || 77 || W1
|- style="background:#ffc;"
| 76 || March 29, 1986 || Washington Capitals || 6–6 || OT || Liut || Hartford Civic Center || 14,266 || 37–35–4 || 78 || T1
|-

|- style="background:#cfc;"
| 77 || April 1, 1986 || Buffalo Sabres || 5–3 || || Liut || Hartford Civic Center || 15,126 || 38–35–4 || 80 || W1
|- style="background:#fcc;"
| 78 || April 3, 1986 || @ Washington Capitals || 2–4 || || Liut || Capital Centre || 14,155 || 38–36–4 || 80 || L1
|- style="background:#cfc;"
| 79 || April 5, 1986 || Toronto Maple Leafs || 7–1 || || Liut || Hartford Civic Center || 15,126 || 39–36–4 || 82 || W1
|- style="background:#cfc;"
| 80 || April 6, 1986 || @ Boston Bruins || 4–3 || || Weeks || Boston Garden || 12,787 || 40–36–4 || 84 || W2
|-

|-
| 1985–86 schedule

Playoffs

Playoffs

Whalers 3, Nordiques 0
The Whalers opened the 1986 Stanley Cup Playoffs against the Quebec Nordiques in a best-of-five series. Quebec finished the regular season with a 43-31-6 record, earning 92 points, and finishing in first place in the Adams Division. In 1985, the Nordiques reached the Wales Conference finals, where they lost to the Philadelphia Flyers. The 1986 post-season was the Whalers first playoff appearance since 1980.

The series opened on April 9 at Le Colisée in Quebec City. The Nordiques opened the scoring 2:44 into the game on a power play goal by Anton Stastny, however, the Whalers Dean Evason scored with 49 seconds remaining in the period to tie the game 1-1. The clubs played to a goalless second period, as the game remained tied heading into the third. In the third period, the Whalers John Anderson scored on the power play at 9:29, giving Hartford their first lead of the game at 2-1. Just over three minutes later, the Nordiques tied the game on a goal by Brent Ashton, as Quebec tied the game 2-2. The game would go into overtime, as the Whalers Sylvain Turgeon scored 2:36 into the extra period, as the Whalers defeated the Nordiques 3-2 to win their first ever post-season game, and take a 1-0 series lead. Mike Liut made 37 saves for the victory.

The second game of the series was played on April 10 in Quebec. The Whalers took an early 1-0 lead on a goal by Stew Gavin 3:53 into the game. At 8:51 of the first period, Paul MacDermid scored for Hartford, giving the club a 2-0 lead over Quebec after the first period. In the second period, MacDermid scored his second goal of the game, as Hartford took a 3-0 lead after two periods. In the third period, the Nordiques Alain Cote scored 1:39 into the period, cutting the Whalers lead to 3-1. With under five minutes remaining in the period, the Whalers Torrie Robertson scored, as Hartford won the game 4-1 and took a 2-0 series lead. Mike Liut was very solid in goal again for the Whalers, as he made 26 saves for the win.

The series shifted back to the Hartford Civic Center for the third game, as the Whalers pushed the Nordiques on the brink of elimination. The third game of the series was played on April 12. The Whalers opened the scoring 2:29 into the game on a power play goal by Kevin Dineen. Just under three minutes later, the Whalers Dave Tippett scored a shorthanded goal to give Hartford a 2-0 lead. The Nordiques Alain Lemieux cut the Whalers lead to 2-1 with a power play goal midway through the period. At 15:08, the Whalers Ron Francis restored the two goal lead with his first career playoff goal. Just 44 seconds later, the Nordiques Brent Ashton cut the Whalers lead down to one with a shorthanded goal, as Hartford held a 3-2 lead. With 40 seconds remaining in the period, the Whalers Ray Ferraro scored a power play, as Hartford took a 4-2 lead into the first intermission. Early in the second period, Ulf Samuelsson scored for Hartford, extending their lead to 5-2. At 11:06 of the second period, the Nordiques Michel Goulet scored a power play goal, cutting the Whalers lead to 5-3. Just over two minutes later, the Whalers Ray Ferraro scored his second power play goal of the game, as Hartford regained their three goal lead. Twenty-six seconds after Ferraro's goal, the Whalers John Anderson scored on the power play, giving the Whales a commanding 7-3 lead. In the third period, Anderson scored his second goal of the game 7:00 into the period, as Hartford took a lead of 8-3. The Nordiques Mark Kumpel scored midway through the period, however, the Whalers Kevin Dineen scored his second goal of the game with under two minutes left, as the Whalers crushed the Nordiques 9-4 to sweep the series and complete the upset. This marked the first time in franchise history that the Whalers had won a series since moving to the NHL.

Harford Whalers 3, Quebec Nordiques 0

Canadiens 4, Whalers 3
The Whalers faced the Montreal Canadiens in a best-of-seven series to determine the champion of the Adams Division. Montreal finished the regular season with a 40-33-7 record, earning 87 points and second place in the Adams Division. In the first round of the post-season, the Canadiens swept the Boston Bruins in three games. The Whalers and Canadiens had previously met in the post-season during the 1979-80 season, as Montreal swept Hartford in the first round of the playoffs.

The series opened on April 17 at the Montreal Forum in Montreal. The two clubs skated to a scoreless first period, as Mike Liut shut the door for the Whalers, making 14 saves during the period. In the second period, Hartford opened the scoring with a goal by Stew Gavin at 4:24 to take a 1-0 lead. Just over two minutes later, the Whalers struck again, as Sylvain Turgeon scored to make it 2-0 for the Whalers. Late in the second period, John Anderson scored on the power play, as the Whalers took a 3-0 lead into the third period. Midway through the third period, the Canadiens Chris Nilan ended the shutout bid by Liut, as he scored to cut the Whalers lead to 3-1. The Whalers Stew Gavin scored his second goal of the game as he scored an empty net goal with 58 seconds left in the period, as Hartford won the game 4-1 and took a 1-0 series lead.

The second game of the series was played on April 19 in Montreal. In the first period, the Canadiens scored first, as Stephane Richer scored on the power play at 12:33 of the period. Just under five minutes later, Guy Carbonneau of the Canadiens scored to make it 2-0. The Canadiens dominated the Whalers in the first period, outshooting them 15-2. In the second period, the Canadiens Guy Carbonneau scored his second goal of the game 6:12 into the period, making it 3-0 for Montreal. The Whalers responded with a power play goal by Ray Ferraro just over a minute later, as Hartford cut the Canadiens lead to 3-1. This would be as close as Hartford would get, as the Canadiens shut down the Whalers for the rest of the game, winning the contest 3-1 and tying the series up at 1-1.

The series shifted to the Hartford Civic Center for game three, played on April 21. Montreal opened the scoring early in the first period on a goal by Kjell Dahlin to take a 1-0 lead. Late in the period, the Canadiens Stephane Richer scored on the power play, as Montreal took a 2-0 lead into the first intermission. The Canadiens struck again, as early in the second period, Claude Lemieux scored as Montreal took a 3-0 lead in the game. The Whalers Dave Tippett scored just 32 seconds after Lemieux, cutting the Canadiens lead to 3-1. In the third period, Montreal continued to hold off the Whalers, then Guy Carbonneau scored an empty net goal late in the period, as Montreal won the game 4-1 and took a 2-1 series lead over Hartford.

The fourth game of the series was played on April 23 in Hartford. The Whalers opened the scoring at 13:53 of the first period, as Stew Gavin scored against Patrick Roy of the Canadiens to give Hartford a 1-0 lead. The two clubs played very tight defensively, as after two periods, the score remained 1-0 Hartford, as the shot count was 12-11 for Montreal through two periods. In the third period, the Canadiens Mats Naslund scored a power play goal at 12:22, as Montreal tied the game 1-1, sending the game into overtime. In the extra period, the Whalers Kevin Dineen scored 1:07 into the period, leading Hartford to a 2-1 victory and tying the series at 2-2.

The series shifted back to Montreal for the fifth game, played on April 25. Only 2:05 into the game, the Canadiens Claude Lemieux scored a power play goal, giving the Canadiens a 1-0 lead. At 8:26 of the first period, Montreal's Guy Carbonneau scored a shorthanded goal, followed by a second power play goal by the Canadiens, this time by Mats Naslund, as Montreal took an early 3-0 in the game. With under five minutes remaining in the period, the Whalers Kevin Dineen scored, as Montreal took a 3-1 lead after the first period. In the second period, the Whalers Kevin Dineen scored his second goal of the game at 14:14, cutting the Canadiens lead down to 3-2. Just under two minutes later, Mike Lalor scored for the Canadiens, as Montreal took a 4-2 lead after two periods. Midway through the third period, the Whalers John Anderson scored, as Hartford trailed Montreal by a score of 4-3. The Canadiens managed to hold off the Whalers, as Guy Carbonneau scored a late goal, as Montreal won the game 5-3 and took a 3-2 series lead.

The series returned to Hartford for the sixth game, with the Whalers facing elimination. The game was played on April 27. In the first period, Montreal fired 14 shots at Mike Liut, however, Liut stopped them all as the game remained scoreless after the first period. In the second period, Dean Evason finally broke through for the Whalers, as he scored at the 7:30 mark of the period, giving the Whalers a 1-0 lead. The Whalers took this lead into the third period. In the third period, the Whalers were able to hold off the Canadiens, as Mike Liut made 32 saves for his first career playoff shutout, as the Whalers defeated the Canadiens 1-0 and tied the series up at 3-3.

The seventh and final game of the series was played back in Montreal on April 29. With only 13 seconds left in the first period, the Canadiens Mike McPhee scored a shorthanded goal, giving the Canadiens a 1-0 lead. The game was played very tight defensively, as Montreal held on to their 1-0 lead late into the third period. The Whalers Dave Babych broke the shutout bid by Patrick Roy with under three minutes left in the game, as Hartford tied the game 1-1, sending the contest into overtime. In the extra period, the Canadiens Claude Lemieux scored on Mike Liut 5:55 into the extra period, as Montreal won the game 2-1 and won the series, eliminating the Whalers from the post-season.

Montreal Canadiens 4, Hartford Whalers 3

Player statistics

Forwards
Note: GP = Games played; G = Goals; A = Assists; Pts = Points; PIM = Penalty minutes

Defencemen
Note: GP = Games played; G = Goals; A = Assists; Pts = Points; PIM = Penalty minutes

Goaltending
Note: GP = Games played; W = Wins; L = Losses; T = Ties; SO = Shutouts; GAA = Goals against average

Transactions
The Whalers were involved in the following transactions during the 1985–86 season.

Trades

Free agents

References

1985-86 Hartford Whalers at Hockey Reference

Hartford Whalers seasons
Hartford
Hartford
National Hockey League All-Star Game hosts
Hartford
Hartford